Ren Fazheng (born August 1962) is a Chinese engineer who is a professor and doctoral supervisor at China Agricultural University.

Biography
Ren was born in Yingkou, Liaoning, in August 1962. In September 1980 he entered China Agricultural University, where he graduated in July 1987. After graduation, he taught at the university.

Honours and awards
 November 18, 2019 Industrial Innovation Award of the Ho Leung Ho Lee Foundation
 November 22, 2019 Member of the Chinese Academy of Engineering (CAE)

References

1962 births
Living people
People from Yingkou
Engineers from Liaoning
China Agricultural University alumni
Academic staff of China Agricultural University
Members of the Chinese Academy of Engineering